Sacred Heart College is a state-integrated single-sex girls' Catholic secondary school located in Lower Hutt, New Zealand.

It was established in 1912 by the Sisters of Our Lady of the Missions and was the first secondary school to be opened in the Hutt Valley. It was originally sited in high street on the property known as Margaret street. In 1957 the school was shifted to the existing site on Laings Road. In May 1980 it became the first Catholic secondary school to be integrated under the Private Schools Conditional Integration Act 1975. The school has six house groups: Lisieux (Pink), Avila (Red), Aubert (Green), Lourdes (Light Blue), Barbier (Dark Blue) and Siena (Yellow).

Due to having earthquake prone buildings the school strengthened its largest building in early 2017 and demolished its tallest in December 2017.

Notable alumnae

 Teresa Bergman, dux 2004, singer-songwriter-guitarist
 Stephanie Dowrick, writer and spiritual teacher
 Catherine Chidgey, novelist

References

Educational institutions established in 1912
Girls' schools in New Zealand
Catholic secondary schools in the Wellington Region
Schools in Lower Hutt
1912 establishments in New Zealand